Magazine Island (Fo Yeuk Chau), originally known as One Tree Island (is an island of Hong Kong, located off the southwest coast of Hong Kong Island, and off the northwestern tip of Ap Lei Chau. For the purpose of local council, it is part of Southern District.

Features
The former Magazine Building on Magazine Island is now a Grade III Historic Building. It was built by the British Dynamite Company, which later became Nobel's Explosives Company, and was once the largest private explosives depot in Hong Kong. In 1908, the government did not renew the company's contract and the magazine was closed. A lighthouse is located at the west end of the island.

See also

 List of islands of Hong Kong

References

Further reading

External links

 Pictures of Magazine Island 
 Picture and location of Magazine Island

Islands of Hong Kong
Southern District, Hong Kong
Populated places in Hong Kong